Arene fricki is a species of sea snail, a marine gastropod mollusk in the family Areneidae.

Description

The shell can grow to be 3mm to 5 mm in length.

Distribution
Arene fricki can be found from Pacific Mexico to Panama.

References

External links
 To Biodiversity Heritage Library (2 publications)
 To ITIS
 To World Register of Marine Species

Areneidae
Gastropods described in 1865